Alexandra Sidorovici (6 July 1906 – 25 August 2000) was a Romanian politician. A prominent communist, she was one of the first group of women elected to the Chamber of Deputies in 1946.

Biography
Sidorovici was born in 1906 in Constanța in a well-to-do family. Her brother,  Teofil, served as a cabinet minister in 1940 before committing suicide. One of her ancestors was British, and she spoke perfect English. She married Silviu Brucan, a communist politician and diplomat, with whom she had three children. Brucan later became a critic of Nicolae Ceaușescu.

During World War II, she reportedly was implicated in spying activities on behalf of the Soviet Union. In April 1945, Sidorovici was appointed by royal decree public prosecutor at the Bucharest People's Tribunal. In this position, which she held until 1946, she participated in trials of the Romanian political and cultural elite. In May and June 1945 she, Constantin Vicol, Ion D. Ioan and Avram Bunaciu prosecuted a dozen prominent journalists, including Pan M. Vizirescu, Stelian Popescu, Nichifor Crainic,  and Radu Gyr.

In the 1946 general elections she was among the first group of women elected to the Chamber of Deputies. In early 1948, she worked on the merger of the Communist Party (PCR) with the Social Democratic Party (PSDR), to form the Romanian Workers' Party (PMR). Later that year she was elected to the new Great National Assembly, and appointed Secretary General of the Ministry of Mines and Petroleum, a role she held until 1958. In 1950 she became an associate professor and deputy head of department at the Department of Marxism–Leninism at the Polytechnic Institute of Bucharest.

Starting in 1955 she accompanied Brucan to the United States, where he was first appointed ambassador of Romania to the United States, and then ambassador to the United Nations from 1959 to 1962. She used the experience as the basis of a book that she co-authored with Brucan (a virulent attack on American institutions). In the 1960s and 1970s she was an associate professor at the Ștefan Gheorghiu Academy, and in 1971 she was awarded the Order of "August 23". 

She died in Bucharest in 2000 and was cremated at the Vitan-Bârzești Crematorium.

Works

References

1906 births
People from Constanța
Romanian Communist Party politicians
Romanian women academics
Members of the Chamber of Deputies (Romania)
Members of the Great National Assembly
2000 deaths
Academic staff of the Politehnica University of Bucharest
21st-century Romanian women politicians
21st-century Romanian politicians